Scattini is a surname. Notable people with the surname include:

Luigi Scattini (1927–2010), Italian film director and screenwriter
Jerry Scattini (born 1941), American former college football coach
Monica Scattini (1956–2015), Italian actress